Tallar Sar or Talarsar may refer to:
 Tallar Sar-e Gharbi
 Tallar Sar-e Sharqi